The Daily Gazette, often known as the Colchester Gazette, is a local daily newspaper covering the north-east Essex area of England. It is published by Newsquest.

An earlier newspaper of the same name was published from 1877, as a weekly.  It closed in 1970, and Essex County Newspapers launched the Evening Gazette as a replacement, published daily from Monday to Friday. Based at Oriel House in the city of Colchester, it also covered Braintree, Clacton, Harwich and Maldon.

In 2009, management and subediting of the newspaper, including the post of editor, were moved to Basildon, outside the area the paper covers.  At the time, the National Union of Journalists claimed that this meant that "the daily paper in the area will effectively be an edition of the Basildon publication".

Like other local newspapers, sales of the Gazette fell from the 1990s onwards, and by 2016 it was selling an average of 9,866 a day.

References

External links
 

Colchester (town)
Newspapers published in Essex
Daily newspapers published in the United Kingdom